Edlington is a civil parish in the metropolitan borough of Doncaster, South Yorkshire, England.  The parish contains five listed buildings that are recorded in the National Heritage List for England.  Of these, one is listed at Grade I, the highest of the three grades, and the others are at Grade II, the lowest grade.  The parish contains the town of Edlington and the surrounding area.  The listed buildings consist of a church, a dovecote, a monument to the memory of a dog, a farmhouse, and a war memorial.


Key

Buildings

References

Citations

Sources

 

Lists of listed buildings in South Yorkshire
Buildings and structures in the Metropolitan Borough of Doncaster